HMS Prometheus was a  protected cruiser of the Royal Navy. Ten sister third class protected cruisers were built — designed by Sir William White. While well-armed for their size, they were primarily workhorses for the overseas fleet considered to be on police duties (not serving with the main battle fleet). She was sold for scrap in 1914.

Construction and armament
The third class cruisers displaced 2,135 tons, had a crew complement of 224 men and were armed with eight QF 4 inch (102 mm) (25 pounder) guns, eight 3 pounder guns, three machine guns and two 18 inch (450 mm) torpedo tubes.

HMS Prometheus was laid down at Earle's Shipbuilding Company′s yard, Hull, Yorkshire in 1897, and launched on 20 October 1898, when she was christened by Lady Maclure, wife of Sir John Maclure, 1st Baronet, deputy chairman of Earle′s Company. She was moved to Sheerness Dockyard, Kent to be fitted with arms in 1899, completed in early January 1900 and transferred to the Medway Fleet Reserve, from which she saw her first commission.

Service history
Commander Frederick Hervey was appointed in command in August 1901 and commissioned the ship at Chatham 25 September 1901 to serve in the Channel Squadron. Commander Frederick Tudor was appointed in command in early 1902, when she had propeller trials at Portsmouth, and was in command when she took part in the fleet review held at Spithead on 16 August 1902 for the coronation of King Edward VII. She visited Souda Bay, Crete with other ships of the Channel squadron the following month. Later the same year she visited Tetouan with HMS Furious, and HMS Pactolus for a show of force against rebellious tribes in the areas around the town. Commander Morgan Singer was appointed in command on 3 January 1903, serving for a year.

Promotheus was sold for scrap on 28 May 1914.

References

 World War I Naval Combat webpage

 

Pelorus-class cruisers of the Royal Navy
Ships built on the Humber
1898 ships